Cygnus OB9 is an OB association in Cygnus. It is near to the Cygnus OB2 association. The region is embedded within a wider one of star formation known as Cygnus X, which is one of the most luminous objects in the sky at radio wavelengths. The region is approximately 5000 light years from Earth in the constellation of Cygnus.

Although Cygnus OB9 has many O and B type stars, Cygnus OB9 is also hidden behind a massive dust cloud known as the Cygnus Rift like Cygnus OB2.

References 

Stellar associations
Cygnus (constellation)
Star-forming regions